Darren John Bicknell (born 24 June 1967) is an English former cricketer. He is a left-handed batsman and a slow left-arm bowler.

Born in Guildford, Darren is the brother of former England seam bowler Martin Bicknell. However, he struggled to have similar international impact in the 1990s, the selectors instead preferring players such as Jason Gallian and Mark Lathwell. Most of Bicknell's career was spent at Surrey, but he finished his career with seven seasons at Nottinghamshire, before retiring at the end of the 2006 season.

Current activities

Darren is now the professional and cricket coach at Oakham School, and Chief Executive of the Belvoir Cricket and Countryside Trust, a charitable organisation which aims to provide cricket and other sporting activities for young people. Other patrons of the trust include Jonathan Agnew, Anton du Beke and Graeme Swann. He is also a governor at Redmile Primary School, and a member of Radcliffe-on-Trent Golf Club playing off a handicap of 7.

Notes

1967 births
Living people
English cricketers
Surrey cricketers
Nottinghamshire cricketers
Sportspeople from Guildford
Marylebone Cricket Club cricketers
Cambridgeshire cricketers